Al Green (born 3 September 1953) is an American-Australian former professional basketball player. He played college basketball for three different colleges and was drafted by the Phoenix Suns in 1979. He arrived in Australia in 1981 and had a successful career in the National Basketball League (NBL) until his retirement in 1993. He won two NBL championships in 1982 and 1984, and was the NBL Most Valuable Player in 1982.

Early life and college
Green was born in New York City and grew up in South Bronx. He attended Maine Central Institute in Pittsfield, Maine, where he was a third-team Parade All-American selection in 1974.

Green began his college basketball career at Arizona Western College before playing two seasons for the NC State Wolfpack between 1975 and 1977. After redshirting the 1977–78 season, he played his final college season in 1978–79 for the LSU Tigers.

Professional career

NFL and NBA drafts
Coming out of college, Green was selected by the San Diego Chargers in May 1979 in the NFL draft as pick #269 as a defensive back despite never having played organised football. The choice was made primarily on Green's size, speed and jumping ability. Green and his agent spoke to the Chargers but despite the money he was being offered to change sports, he decided that he wanted to continue playing basketball.

The following month, Green was selected by the Phoenix Suns in the third round of the 1979 NBA draft with the 64th overall pick. He spent the 1979 preseason with the Suns but never debuted in the NBA.

CBA (1979–1981)
Green's first professional stint came during the 1979–80 season with the Utica Olympics of the Continental Basketball Association (CBA). He continued in the CBA with the Atlantic City Hi-Rollers for the 1980–81 season.

NBL (1981–1993)
In early 1981, Green moved to Australia to play for the West Adelaide Bearcats in the National Basketball League (NBL). He earned All-NBL First Team in his first season. Following the NBL season, he moved to the Philippines where he helped the Crispa Redmanizers win the 1981 PBA Reinforced Filipino Conference.

Green returned to the Bearcats in 1982 and won the NBL Most Valuable Player Award. He helped the Bearcats reach the 1982 NBL Grand Final, where they defeated the Geelong Supercats to win the NBL championship.

Green continued on with the Bearcats in 1983 and 1984. In 1984, he scored 50 or more points four times, including a 71-point game. He subsequently earned the 1984 scoring title.

In 1985, Green joined the Adelaide 36ers. He helped the 36ers reach the NBL Grand Final, where they lost to the Brisbane Bullets. He earned All-NBL First Team honours. In 1986, he helped the 36ers return to the grand final and won his second NBL championship, with the 36ers this time defeating the Bullets. He parted ways with the 36ers after the 1990 NBL season.

Between 1991 and 1993, Green played for the Newcastle Falcons. He retired from the NBL in 1993 having played 340 games. He finished with career averages of 22.1 points, 4.2 rebounds, 3.0 assists and 1.0 steals per game.

Coaching career
In 2011, Green was appointed head coach of the Woodville Warriors men's team in the Central ABL. He served in that role until being sacked early in the 2014 season. He immediately joined the Forestville Eagles as an assistant coach.

In 2016 and 2017, Green served as coach of the South Adelaide Panthers.

Athletics
Green was also a professional runner who won Adelaide's famous Bay Sheffield sprint race held over 120 metres in both 1983 and 1984. During 1985, after he became a naturalised Australian, Green announced his retirement from professional running with the intention of running for Australia at the 1986 Commonwealth Games although he did not end up making the team.

Personal life
As of 2016, Green lives in Adelaide and works as a U.S. basketball tour guide.

NBL career stats

|-
| style="text-align:left"| 1981
| style="text-align:left;"| West Adelaide Bearcats
| 23 || 23 || NA || .500 || NA || .733 || NA || NA || NA || NA || 26.0
|-
| style="text-align:left; background:#afe6ba;"| 1982†
| style="text-align:left;"| West Adelaide Bearcats
| 28 || 28 || NA || .587 || NA || .743 || 4.7 || 2.4 || NA || 0.0 || 26.5
|-
| style="text-align:left"| 1983
| style="text-align:left;"| West Adelaide Bearcats
| 26 || 26 || NA || .567 || NA || .763 || 3.7 || 2.3 || 1.0 || 0.2 || 29.6
|-
| style="text-align:left"| 1984
| style="text-align:left;"| West Adelaide Bearcats
| 21 || 21 || NA || .523 || .349 || .760 || 6.4 || 5.0 || 1.9 || 0.3 || 39.5
|-
| style="text-align:left"| 1985
| style="text-align:left;"| Adelaide 36ers
| 28 || 28 || NA || .541 || .366 || .793 || 6.0 || 5.1 || 1.3 || 0.3 || 31.0
|-
| style="text-align:left; background:#afe6ba;"| 1986†
| style="text-align:left;"| Adelaide 36ers
| 30 || 30 || NA || .505 || .389 || .689 || 4.5 || 3.5 || 1.1 || 0.5 || 19.4
|-
| style="text-align:left"| 1987
| style="text-align:left;"| Adelaide 36ers
| 29 || 29 || 41.0 || .537 || .368 || .720 || 5.0 || 3.2 || 0.8 || 0.4 || 23.1
|-
| style="text-align:left"| 1988
| style="text-align:left;"| Adelaide 36ers
| 26 || 26 || 36.3 || .542 || .325 || .728 || 3.9 || 3.9 || 1.4 || 0.6 || 20.0
|-
| style="text-align:left"| 1989
| style="text-align:left;"| Adelaide 36ers
| 25 || 25 || 37.7 || .528 || .366 || .783 || 3.5 || 3.8 || 1.2 || 0.2 || 14.7
|-
| style="text-align:left"| 1990
| style="text-align:left;"| Adelaide 36ers
| 26 || NA || 22.5 || .505 || .400 || .750 || 2.1 || 2.2 || 0.9 || 0.3 || 9.8
|-
| style="text-align:left"| 1991
| style="text-align:left;"| Newcastle Falcons
| 26 || 26 || 41.1 || .533 || .383 || .702 || 5.1 || 2.1 || 1.0 || 0.2 || 22.2
|-
| style="text-align:left"| 1992
| style="text-align:left;"| Newcastle Falcons
| 24 || 24 || 34.4 || .548 || .414 || .805 || 5.8 || 3.0 || 1.1 || 0.4 || 18.9
|-
| style="text-align:left"| 1993
| style="text-align:left;"| Newcastle Falcons
| 28 || 28 || 32.0 || .413 || .310 || .683 || 4.3 || 2.7 || 1.1 || 0.2 || 10.3
|- class="sortbottom"
| style="text-align:center;" colspan="2" | Career
| 340 || NA || NA || .531 || .364 || .748 || 4.2 || 3.0 || 1.0 || 0.3 || 22.1
|}

References

External links
andthefoul.net profile
"Al Green: From the tough streets of the Bronx to Adelaide, South Australia" at theinnersanctum.com.au

1953 births
Living people
Adelaide 36ers players
American emigrants to Australia
American expatriate basketball people in Australia
American expatriate basketball people in the Philippines
American men's basketball players
Arizona Western Matadors men's basketball players
Atlantic City Hi-Rollers players
Australian men's basketball players
Basketball players from New York City
Basketball coaches from New York (state)
Basketball players from Adelaide
Crispa Redmanizers players
LSU Tigers basketball players
Maine Central Institute alumni
NC State Wolfpack men's basketball players
Newcastle Falcons (basketball) players
Parade High School All-Americans (boys' basketball)
Philippine Basketball Association imports
Phoenix Suns draft picks
Point guards
Sportsmen from South Australia
Sportspeople from the Bronx
Utica Olympics players